Bandiana is a Suburb of the City of Wodonga local government area in northeast Victoria, Australia.

History
Bandiana  takes its name from the early name for the area, probably from a First Nations toponym.

The hill now known as Bears Hill appears as Bandiana Range in early maps and the Street family selected the property Bandiana Park in the late 1800s.

The Australian Defence Force has had a logistics and maintenance base in the area since 1942 and there was once a rail line and station servicing the area.  Bandiana Military Post Office opened on 28 September 1942 and the region is still a major Australian Army logistics facility.

Population
In the 2016 Census, there were 615 people in Bandiana. 86.4% of people were born in Australia and 89.6% of people only spoke English at home. The most common responses for religion were Catholic 22.5%. Of the employed people in Bandiana, 56.8% worked in Defence.

Today
The Bandiana Army Golf Club on Donegan Road is now closed.

See also
Bandiana railway station, Victoria
The Army Museum Bandiana

References

Towns in Victoria (Australia)
City of Wodonga